IKVM.NET is an implementation of Java for Mono and the Microsoft .NET Framework. IKVM is free software, distributed under the zlib permissive free software license.

The original developer, Jeroen Frijters, discontinued work on IKVM in 2015. In 2018, Windward Studios forked IKVM.NET to continue development on the open-sourced IKVM. In 2022 Jerome Haltom and others picked up the work on a new GitHub organization and finished .NET Core support.

Components 
IKVM.NET includes the following components:
 A Java virtual machine (JVM) implemented in .NET
 A .NET implementation of the Java class libraries
 A tool that translates Java bytecode (JAR files) to .NET IL (DLLs or EXE files).
 Tools that enable Java and .NET interoperability

IKVM.NET can run compiled Java code (bytecode) directly on Microsoft .NET or Mono. The bytecode is converted on the fly to CIL and executed.

By contrast J# is a Java syntax on the .NET framework, whereas IKVM.NET is effectively a Java framework running on top of the .NET framework.

Jeroen Frijters was the main contributor to IKVM.NET. He is Technical Director of Sumatra Software, based in the Netherlands.

Name

The "IKVM" portion of the name is a play on "JVM" in which the author "just took the two letters adjacent to the J".

Status
, the machine supported Java 1.6. AWT and Swing are partially supported. IKVM uses OpenJDK as its class library.

IKVM has limited support for Abstract Window Toolkit (AWT). For this reason, it cannot run ImageJ and other apps that depend on AWT. Implementing AWT in IKVM.NET is a low priority.

IKVM 8 implements Java 8.

The IKVM organization also maintains IKVM.Maven.Sdk, an extension to the .NET PackageReference system that allows direct references to and transpiling of Maven artifacts. IKVM.Maven.Sdk is also available on NuGet.org.

See also

Free Java implementations
J#

References

External links

IKVM.NET wiki

Java virtual machine
Mono (software)
Cross-platform free software